Syran al-Gharbi is a sub-district located in Shaharah District, 'Amran Governorate, Yemen. Syran al-Gharbi had a population of 16503 according to the 2004 census.

References 

Sub-districts in Shaharah District